Sylvester Maxwell (April 16, 1775 – December 21, 1858) was an American lawyer and legislator.

He was son of Hugh Maxwell, and was born April 16, 1775, at Heath, Massachusetts. He graduated from Yale University in 1797.  The year following his graduation he taught an academy in Burke County, Georgia. He then returned to Massachusetts and studied law with Judge Hinckley of Northampton, Massachusetts.  He was admitted to the bar, established himself in the practice at Charlemont, Massachusetts, and there resided through life. He had for about thirty years the chief direction of the municipal affairs of that town, and was repeatedly a member of the Massachusetts State Legislature, in both branches.

He died in Charlemont, Mass., December 21, 1858, aged 82.

1775 births
1858 deaths
Yale University alumni
Massachusetts lawyers
Massachusetts state senators
Members of the Massachusetts House of Representatives
People from Heath, Massachusetts
People from Charlemont, Massachusetts
19th-century American lawyers